Carlos Alfredo Saa Posso (born December 4, 1983) is a Colombian football defender, who currently plays for Millonarios in Categoría Primera A.

Statistics (Official games/Colombian Ligue and Colombian Cup)
(As of November 14, 2010)

References

External links

1983 births
Living people
Colombian footballers
América de Cali footballers
Deportivo Pasto footballers
Botafogo Futebol Clube (SP) players
Grêmio Esportivo Juventus players
Millonarios F.C. players
Colombian expatriate footballers
Expatriate footballers in Brazil
Association football defenders
Sportspeople from Valle del Cauca Department